The 1994 United States House of Representatives election in Wyoming were held on November 8, 1994 to determine who will represent the state of Wyoming in the United States House of Representatives. Wyoming has one, at large district in the House, apportioned according to the 1990 United States Census, due to its low population. Representatives are elected for two-year terms.  This election was for an open seat because incumbent Craig L. Thomas retired to run for U.S. Senator for Wyoming.

Major candidates

Democratic 
Bob Schuster

Republican 
Barbara Cubin

Results

References 

1994 Wyoming elections
Wyoming
1994